This is a complete list of United States senators during the 117th United States Congress listed by seniority, from January 3, 2021, to January 3, 2023. It is a historical listing and will contain people who have not served the entire two-year Congress should anyone resign, die, or be expelled.

In this Congress, the most junior senior senator was Kelly Loeffler until Jon Ossoff and Raphael Warnock were sworn in on January 20, 2021, after which Ossoff became the most junior senior senator. The most senior junior senator is Maria Cantwell.

Order of service is based on the commencement of the senator's first term. Behind this is former service as a senator (only giving the senator seniority within his or her new incoming class), service as vice president, a House member, a cabinet secretary, or a governor of a state. The final factors are the population of the senator's state and the alphabetical position of the senator's surname.

Terms of service

U.S. Senate seniority list

See also
 117th United States Congress
 List of members of the United States House of Representatives in the 117th Congress by seniority
 Seniority in the United States Senate

Notes

References

External links

117
Senate Seniority